William Patterson (4 March 1914–unknown) was a Scottish professional footballer who played in the Football League for Lincoln City and Mansfield Town.

References

1914 births
Scottish footballers
Association football forwards
English Football League players
Greenock Morton F.C. players
Ballymena F.C. players
Belfast Celtic F.C. players
Lisburn Distillery F.C. players
East Fife F.C. players
Dundee F.C. players
Arbroath F.C. players
Raith Rovers F.C. players
Stenhousemuir F.C. players
Lincoln City F.C. players
Mansfield Town F.C. players
Year of death missing